ATV Offroad Fury Pro is a racing video game for the PlayStation Portable, a loose port of ATV Offroad Fury 4, developed by Climax Racing and published by Sony Computer Entertainment. It is the successor of ATV Offroad Fury: Blazin' Trails. The game was released on October 26, 2006 in North America (five days before ATV Offroad Fury 4 on the PlayStation 2), in Europe on June 20, 2008, and in Australia six days later.

Gameplay
ATV Offroad Fury Pro offers the same physics and vehicles as ATV Offroad Fury 4, but contains different race tracks, vehicles, and mini-games. It features both ad hoc (local area network) or Infrastructure (web) multiplayer modes. It offers tutorials in order to master the Trophy Trucks and Dune Buggies. A tutorial mode exists to help players master tricks. The MX Motocross has the same tricks as the ATVs, minus the "bicycle" trick. The championship modes offer stunt challenges, sponsor events, and races. This game also includes new vehicle classes known as snowmobiles and rally cars, which are exclusive to this game.

Eight "Classic" tracks can be unlocked for ATV Offroad Fury 4 by synchronizing both games' Save Files via USB Link. These tracks appear in previous games in the series, and must be unlocked through Pro before unlocking them in 4.

Reception

The game was met with slightly positive reception upon release, as GameRankings gave it a score of 76.86%, while Metacritic gave it 76 out of 100.

References

External links

2006 video games
MX vs. ATV
ATV Offroad Fury
PlayStation Portable games
PlayStation Portable-only games
Racing video games
Sony Interactive Entertainment games
Video games developed in the United Kingdom